The Metropolitan Cathedral of the Immaculate Conception, commonly known as simply the Zamboanga Cathedral, is a church located in Zamboanga City, Philippines. It is the seat of the Archdiocese of Zamboanga.

History
The first church was originally located at the front of Plaza Pershing, where the present Universidad de Zamboanga stands. The church was designated a cathedral in 1910 when the diocese of Zamboanga was created. In 1943, the cathedral was one of the edifices bombarded by Japanese soldiers during World War II. In 1956, the cathedral was relocated beside Ateneo de Zamboanga University, formerly known as the Jardin de Chino.

Features of the cathedral

The original cathedral
The cathedral located at the Plaza Pershing was made of wood and concrete. The image of the Immaculate Conception was located at the main altar, with two Jesuit saints Ignatius of Loyola and Francis Xavier on each side. The image of the patroness was said to be spared from the bombs of World War II and was transferred to a road now known as La Purisima Street.

The old cathedral at La Purisima (1956–1998)
The former structure of the cathedral was designed in 1956. The site used to be the chapel of the Jardin de Chino. The facade consists of the life-size sculpture of Immaculate Conception at the left side and the bell-tower at right. The chapel of the saints were located inside the area where the image outside was located. The stations of the cross were made of stained glass at each side and the added station, "Resurrection", was located near the right altar at the confession area. Then the bronze relief of the last supper was located at the day chapel which serves later as the perpetual adoration chapel.

The Metropolitan Cathedral (1998–present)
The present structure of the cathedral was built in 1998–2002 in cruciform, of which the candle-like design is appropriate to the cathedral's patron. Inside the main church is marble statue of the Immaculate Conception designed by Philippine National Artist for Sculpture Napoleon Abueva. Along the aisles are the stained-glass symbolic images of all dioceses in Mindanao from 1910 to 1984. The day chapel at the ground floor is used for weekday masses. Fronting the day chapel is the baptistery with the relic of Our Lady of the Pillar, the patroness of the city. Behind the day chapel is the columbarium with a replica of Michelangelo's "Pietà" and the stained-glass images of the 12 apostles around it. The left wing houses the parish office and the adoration chapel, while the convention hall is located in the right wing. The original statue of the Immaculate Conception, which was placed in the main altar of the old church, can be seen at the parish office.

The new structure of the cathedral was designed by Abarro and Associates through the efforts of former Msgr. Crisanto de la Cruz, who said that the decay of the old cathedral's ceiling damaged by termites was one of the reasons why the reconstruction should take place. The design of the new cathedral was unveiled in December 1997. The old structure had been demolished a day after Easter in 1998, preserving its stained glass window and sculpture from the facade, which respectively are located at the rear portion of the new church and at the left side. The cathedral was solemnly dedicated on December 6, 1999, with Archbishop  Ricardo Cardinal Vidal of Cebu and President Joseph Estrada Ejercito as guests of honor. The day chapel, columbarium, baptistery, the multi-purpose hall and office were constructed in 2002.

A more recent addition to the cathedral is the Century Bell Tower, which broke ground on the feast of the Immaculate Conception in 2010. This belfry, located at the Ateneo side of the cathedral, marked the 100th anniversary of the Archdiocese of Zamboanga.

Chapel communities under the cathedral parish
Saint Catherine of Seina – Sta. Catalina
Christ the King – Martha Community
Barangay Sang Birhen – Lustre Community
Our Lady of Lourdes – BEC of Sucabon
San Nicholas de Tolentino – Canelar Ronda
Our Lady of Fatima – Camino Nuevo
San Lorenzo Ruiz – Canelar Tabuk
Sagrada Familia – Camino Nuevo
Our Mother of Perpetual Help – Canelar Presa

External links
http://www.servinghistory.com/topics/Metropolitan_Cathedral_of_the_Immaculate_Conception_%28Zamboanga_City%29

Roman Catholic cathedrals in the Philippines
Roman Catholic churches in Zamboanga del Sur
Buildings and structures in Zamboanga City
Roman Catholic churches completed in 2002
2002 establishments in the Philippines